Kacık (also: Kaçık) is a village in the Mudurnu District of Bolu Province in Turkey. Its population is 25 (2021).

References

Villages in Mudurnu District